Wafabank was a private bank in Morocco, that belonged to the Kettani family. In 2004, the Kettanis sold their stakes to ONA Group which resulted in the merger of the bank with Banque Commerciale du Maroc to form Attijariwafa Bank.

History
1904 France's Compagnie Algérienne established its first Moroccan branch in Tangier, later complemented by branches in Casablanca and other Moroccan cities
1959 On the eve of independence, the Compagnie Algérienne, with 38 branches, had the largest network in Morocco.
1964 The Moroccan operations of the Compagnie Algérienne became an autonomous subsidiary, the Compagnie Marocaine de Crédit et de Banque (CMCB)
1968 A group of Moroccan private investors acquired majority control of the CMCB, together with the Compagnie Financière de Suez.
1985 CMCB changed its name to Wafabank.
1986 Wafabank moved its HQ to Casablanca.
1987 Wafabank established a subsidiary in Belgium.
1993 Wafabank carried out an IPO.
1996 Wafabank acquired BBV's Uniban subsidiary and BBV took an 8% stake in Wafabank. Credit Agricole Indosuez also took a stake in Wafabank (14.8%).
2000 Wafabank and the Senegalese holding "Keur Khadim," agreed to establish Senbank to provide banking services in the Economic Community of West African States (ECOWAS).
2001 Wafabank acquired BBVA's subsidiary BBVA Maroc and BBVA increased its stake in Wafabank to 10%, further cementing the partnership commenced in 1997.
2003 Banque Commerciale du Maroc acquired Wafabank.

References

1904 establishments in Morocco
2004 disestablishments in Morocco
Banks established in 1904
Banks disestablished in 2004
Banks of Morocco
Defunct banks of Morocco

Attijariwafa bank Stock in the Casablanca Stock Exchange